Right of passage, in international law, means (approximately) a country's right for its ships to pass through the territorial seas of foreign states and straits used for international navigation.

References

International law